The 2023 SAFF Women's Friendly Tournament was the first edition of the SAFF Women's International Friendly Tournament, an invitational women's football tournament held in Saudi Arabia from 11 to 19 January 2023. It consisted of a single match round-robin tournament. It featured four teams, Namely Comoros, Mauritius, Pakistan and hosts Saudi Arabia.

Format
The four invited teams played a round-robin tournament. Points awarded in the group stage followed the formula of three points for a win, one point for a draw, and zero points for a loss. In the event two teams were tied in points, tie-breakers would be applied in the order of goal difference, goals scored, head-to-head result, and a fair play score based on the number of yellow and red cards.

Venue
The stadium chosen by SAFF to host the 2023 SAFF Women's Friendly Tournament is located in Khobar a city in the Eastern Province.

Teams
The following four teams participated in the tournament:

Squads

Match officials
The following official were appointed by SAFF to officiate the tournament: 
Referees

  Shahenda Saad Ali ElMaghrabi
  Anoud Alasmari
  Edita Mirabidova

Assistant referees

  Yara Abdelfattah
  Heba Saadieh
  Kristina Sereda

Standings

Results
All times are local, SAST (UTC+3:00).

Statistics

Goalscorers

Discipline
In the tournament, a player will be suspended for the subsequent match in the competition for either getting red card or accumulating two yellow cards in two different matches.

Media coverage

References

External links
 Official website 
 Official website 

SAFF Women's Friendly Tournament
SAFF Women's Friendly Tournament
2023 SAFF Women's Friendly Tournament